Cerrillos is one of the 31 barrios of the municipality of Ponce, Puerto Rico.  Along with Magueyes, Tibes, Portugués, Montes Llanos, Maragüez, and Machuelo Arriba, Cerrillos is one of the municipality's seven interior rural barrios. It was founded in 1878.

Location
Cerrillos is located in the eastern section of the municipality, northeast of the city of Ponce, at latitude 18.050848 N, and longitude -66.576027 W.

Boundaries
Cerrillos is bounded on the North by the hills north of route PR-587 and Río Cerrillos, on the South by El Monte Street (roughly), Guilarte Street (roughly), and Madrid Street (roughly), on the West by Río Cerrillos, and on the East by the hills east of PR-587, the eastern edge of Lake Number 5, and Palmarejo Road.

In terms of barrio-to-barrio boundaries, Cerrillos is bounded on the North by barrios Maragüez and Real, in the South by barrios Sabanetas and Coto Laurel, in the West by barrio Machuelo Arriba, and in the East by barrios Real and Coto Laurel.

Features and demographics
Cerrillos is home to four lakes, named Lake Number Two through Lake Number Five. Despite its name, Cerrillos Lake is not located in Barrio Cerrillos, but in neighboring Maragüez. Lake Cerrillos is named after the river that feeds it, Rio Cerrillos, which does run through barrio Cerillos.  The communities of Ponderosa, Valle Alto, Portales del Monte, Haciendas del Monte, Mansiones del Sur, Mansiones de Ponce, Mansiones del Lago, and Cerillo Hoyo are located in barrio Cerrillos.

In 2000, the population of Cerrillos was 4,281. The population density in Cerrillos was 1,380 people per square mile. Major roads serving Barrio Cerrillos are PR-14 on the southern area, PR-587 in the northern sections, and PR-139 and PR-5139 in the western portion of the barrio.

In 2010, the population of Cerrillos was 4,356 persons, and it had a density of 1,400.6 persons per square mile.

The highest point in Barrio Cerrillos stands at 1,050 feet and is located at the northernmost tip of the barrio.

Gallery

See also

 List of communities in Puerto Rico

References

External links

Barrio Cerrillos
1878 establishments in Puerto Rico